SNM may refer to:

Sacred Name Movement
Sant Nirankari Mission
Scottish National Movement
Slovak National Museum
Somali National Movement
Special nuclear material